Maesbury is a small scattered community in Shropshire, England, south of the town of Oswestry, falling within the Oswestry Rural parish.

The name is derived from maes, meaning field or plain in Brythonic Welsh,
and burh, meaning fort in Old English.

Maesbury traditionally consists of five hamlets: Ball, Gwernybrenin, Newbridge, Maesbury and Maesbury Marsh, though the wider area now includes Ashfield, Aston and Woolston.

Maesbury Marsh is at the southern end of the area. There is a public house here, located by the main road bridge over the Montgomery Canal, called The Navigation Inn. Local restoration of the Montgomery Canal has been completed and it connects with the Shropshire Union Canal/Ellesmere Canal further to the north east.  Further restoration is taking place to the south west through Crickheath.  There is a newly constructed nature reserve at Bridge 81, a lift bridge over a minor road, by Bridge House.
There is another public house in Ball called The Original Ball on the road into Oswestry.

In nearby Woolston is St Winifred's Well, which is believed to have been a resting place for monks travelling from Holywell to Shrewsbury Abbey with her body.

A biennial canal festival is held in Maesbury.

The local small primary school - Maesbury Primary School - located at Ashfield Close the school faced closure twice after over a 100 year history which also included deaths linked to TB in the 30's and closed its doors in 2013. The building reopened as a children's nursery after renovation in 2017.

The Village is connected to the nearest town Oswestry via bus route which also connects to Shrewsbury.

References

External links

 www.maesbury.org
 Maesbury Canal Festival

Villages in Shropshire